T. C. is the mascot for the Minnesota Twins. He was first introduced to Minnesota on April 3, 2000. T. C. is loosely modeled after the Hamm's Beer Bear, a mascot used in advertisements for Hamm's Brewery, an early sponsor for the Twins. The "T. C." stands for the "Twin Cities", Minneapolis and St. Paul. Prior to T.C., the mascot for the Minnesota Twins 1980–81 was a loon named "Twinkie". T.C. can be seen wearing the team home main or alternate uniform with the TC mark on his cap, just like the rest of the team. The original person who portrayed T.C. was fired after the 2019 season. In 2021, when the Twins Opened back up Target Field to fans, 2 new actors (who were said to play T.C. the year before but only made minor appearances due to the COVID-19 Pandemic not allowing fans inside the stadium) started portraying him full time and his mouth slightly changed and his tongue is less visible. T.C. also has his own statue outside of Target Field where the team plays.

References

Minnesota Twins
Mascots introduced in 2000
Bear mascots
Major League Baseball team mascots